The 1901–02 season the 29th season of competitive football in Scotland and the 12th season of the Scottish Football League.

League competitions

Scottish League Division One

Scottish League Division Two

Other honours

Cup honours

National

County

Non-league honours 

Highland League

Other Leagues

Glasgow Exhibition
Held to coincide with the Glasgow International Exhibition (1901), this early season competition was won by Rangers, beating Celtic in the final.

British League Cup
Held at the end of the season to raise funds for survivors and widows of the 1902 Ibrox disaster, Rangers offered the International Exhibition Cup trophy for the winners of the competition – Celtic were the victors, overcoming Rangers in the final.

Scotland national team

Scotland were winners of the 1902 British Home Championship, but endured the deaths of 25 supporters at the Ibrox disaster on 5 April 1902.

Key:
 (H) = Home match
 (A) = Away match
 BHC = British Home Championship

Other national teams

Scottish League XI

Notes

References

External links
Scottish Football Historical Archive

 
Seasons in Scottish football